Girônimo Zanandréa (9 June 1936 – 3 November 2019) was a Brazilian Roman Catholic bishop.

Zanandréa was born in Brazil and was ordained to the priesthood in 1964. He served as coadjutor bishop of the Roman Catholic Diocese of Erexim, Brazil, from 1987 to 1994 and as the bishop of the Exerim Diocese from 1994 to 2012.

Notes

1936 births
2019 deaths
20th-century Roman Catholic bishops in Brazil
21st-century Roman Catholic bishops in Brazil
Roman Catholic bishops of Erexim